Madhurakavi Alvar was one of the twelve Alvars saints of South India, who are known for their affiliation to Vaishnava tradition of Hinduism. The verses of the Alvars are compiled as the Naalayira Divya Prabandham and the 108 temples revered are classified as Divya Desams. Madhurakavi is considered to be the sixth in the line of the twelve Alvars. He was the disciple of Nammalvar, considered to be the greatest among the twelve Alvars, his contributions amounting to 11 among the 4000 stanzas in the Naalayira Divya Prabandam. Madhurakavi is believed to have recorded and compiled the works of Nammalvar, the Tiruvaymoli (1102 verses). The 11 verses of Kanninun Cirutampu composed by Madhurakavi Alvar may be considered to be the inspiration for the 4000 verses of Naalayira Divya Prabandham. These verses were chanted by Nathamuni 12,000 times to propitiate Nammalvar and re-obtain the lost Naalayira Divya Prabandham from Nammalvar.

As per Hindu legend, Nammalvar remained speechless from his birth sitting in a tamarind tree and he first interacted with Madhurakavi, who saw a bright light shining to the south, and followed it until he reached the tree where the boy was residing. The works of Madhurakavi along with the other Alvars contributed to the philosophical and theological ideas of Vaishnavism. The verses of Madhurakavi and other Alvars are recited as a part of daily prayers and during festive occasions in several Vishnu temples in Tamil Nadu.

Life
Madhurakavi was born before Nammalvar, in a Brahmin family, in the month of Chittirai and in chitra star in Thirukkolur near Alwarthirunagari. The presiding deity in the temple is called Vaitha Maanidhi, meaning the storage of great wealth. He is believed to be the divine form of Kumudha Ganesa, the disciple of Vishvaksena, a servant of Vishnu. He is also believed to be the incarnation of Garuda, the sacred eagle vehicle of Vishnu. Though some believe that he is an incarnation of Garuda, some accounts show that he is the incarnation of Kumuda, Vishvaksena's disciple, while Nammalvar himself is the incarnation of Vishvaksena (Vishvaksena is the commander in chief of Vishnu's army). Madhurakavi Alvar lived during the lifetime of Nammalvar (Vishvaksena's incarnation).

Madhurakavi is believed to have learnt the Vedas and considered well-versed in both Tamil and Sanskrit. He used to compose poems in the praise of Vishnu. At one stage in his life, he decided to abandon all the chains of livelihood and strive towards moksha. In this pursuit he undertook a pilgrimage to the Divya Desam located in northern India like Ayodhya and Mathura.

Meeting Nammalvar 
In popular tradition, when Madhurakavi Alvar, after long tour, had reached Ayodhya and completed the mangalasasanam of the enchanting forms of Rama, Sita, Lakshmana, Hanuman and others, he noticed a glowing ball of fire in the sky. However much he tried, he could not understand the reason for this phenomenon. He also noticed that the ball of fire started moving southwards. He decided to follow the light which led him to Alwarthirunagari, and finally disappeared. Madhurakavi already heard about a sixteen-year-old youth (Nammalvar) who spent his life since birth under a Tamarind tree without eating anything and emitting a divine glow. Madhurakavi proceeded straight to the seat of Nammalvar who was in a trance. In order to test Nammalvar, Madhurakavi dropped a stone. Unable to elicit any reaction from the child, he asked him a riddle:

"செத்ததன் வயிற்றில் சிறியது பிறந்தால் எத்தைத்தின்று எங்கே கிடக்கும்?"

"If an infant is born in the womb of the dead, on what will it subsist and where will it stay?" (philosophically; if the subtle soul is embodied in the gross body, what are its actions and thoughts?) Nammalvar broke his lifelong silence and responded,

"அத்தைத் தின்று அங்கே கிடக்கும்"

Translation: "On that it will subsist, in that it will stay!" (meaning that if the soul identifies with the body, it will be the body but if it serves the divine, it will stay in Vaikuntha and eat(think) of God).

Story of the idols 
When Nammalvar was ready to go to Vaikuntha (depart earthly existence), a teary-eyed Madhurakavi asked Nammalvar what to do next. Nammalvar advised Madhurakavi to boil the waters of Tamraparni and stated that an idol will form during boiling of the water. Madhurakavi did as per Nammalvar's advice. When he had boiled the waters of Tamraparni, he gained an idol of Bhagavad Ramanuja. He was surprised to see that the idol was different from what he had expected. He went to Nammalvar with the idol and the latter told him that this idol was Bhavishyadhacharya (future guru) and that he would be born 4000 years from then. He again advised to boil the waters of Tamraparni. Madhurakavi once again boiled the waters of Tamraparni and finally got the idol of Nammalvar.

Works
The eleven verses of Madhurakavi are classified as Kanninun Cirutampu, all of which are in four lines in praise of his divine teacher, Nammalvar. The verses are compiled as Naalayira Divya Prabandam along with the work of the other eleven Alvars. Mathurakavi was instrumental in spreading the works of Nammalvar and composing tunes to each of them. The verses begin with "The name of the great one, my acharya of Kurukoor, brings nectar to my tongue and far sweeter than the name of the Lord". It is believed that Madhurakavi compiled and codified all the verses of Tiruvaymoli by Nammalvar as he recited them.

Notes

References
 
 
 
 
 

Vaishnava saints
Alvars
Bhakti movement
Tamil Hindu saints